Shree Vidyalaya is a private school in Gobichettipalayam, India. It was founded in 1986 by Dr.K.N.Sengottaiyan as a part of Sakunthala Sengottaiyan Educational Trust.

About the School
The school enrolls children from kindergarten to higher secondary. The medium of instruction is English. Other languages taught include Hindi, Tamil and Sanskrit. As of 2010, the school had nearly 1250 students on the roll. It has a "full time dyslexic center" and is one of the few schools in the state to have this facility. Shree Vidyalaya celebrating its 30th year (1986-2015) 30 years of Excellence in Education. In March 2015 X-Public Examination Shree Vidyalaya School student S.Dheepthi scored  State First Rank, scored 499 out of 500.

Facilities
The school has a library, four science laboratories, an audio-visual theater, two computer laboratories and an open auditorium. Sports facilities include two play grounds, a basketball court, a volleyball court, a kabbadi pitch and athletics ground. Multimedia Lab.

References and notes

External links
 Official website

Primary schools in Tamil Nadu
High schools and secondary schools in Tamil Nadu
Schools in Erode district
Education in Gobichettipalayam
Educational institutions established in 1986
1986 establishments in Tamil Nadu